Series 13 or Season 13 may refer to:

 Lego Minifigures (theme)#Series 13, the toy line by Lego
 Warehouse 13, the TV series
 13" series laptops
 Dell Inspiron 13
 Dell Latitude 13
 Dell Latitude 13 Education Series
 Lenovo ThinkPad 13

See also
 System 13